Mordellistena thuringiaca is a species of beetle in the genus Mordellistena of the family Mordellidae. It was described by Ermisch in 1963.

References

External links
Coleoptera. BugGuide.

Beetles described in 1963
thuringiaca
Endemic fauna of Germany